Lincoln County Schools is the School district that presides over all of Lincoln County, North Carolina.

Schools
 East Lincoln High School
East Lincoln Middle School
Catawba Springs Elementary
St. James Elementary
Iron Station Elementary
North Lincoln High School
North Lincoln Middle School
Pumpkin Center Primary School
Pumpkin Center Intermediate School
Rock Springs Elementary
Lincolnton High School
Lincolnton Middle School
Battleground Elementary School
Kiser Intermediate School
G.E. Massey Elementary School
S. Ray Lowder Elementary School
West Lincoln High School
West Lincoln Middle School
Union Elementary School
Norris S. Childers Elementary School
North Brook Elementary School
Love Memorial Elementary School
Asbury School

School districts in North Carolina
Education in Lincoln County, North Carolina